Coxcoxtli was a king of city-state Culhuacán.

He had two children — a son called Huehue Acamapichtli and a daughter Atotoztli I, who married Opochtli Iztahuatzin and bore him Acamapichtli, the first ruler of Tenochtitlan. He was thus an ancestor of Aztec emperors.

Sources

Bibliography
 
 

Tlatoque